Paalooti Valartha Kili is a 1976 Indian Tamil-language drama film directed by Devaraj–Mohan and written by Vietnam Veedu Sundaram. The film stars Vijayakumar and Sripriya It is based on the stage play Raja Parambarai by Komal Swaminathan. The film was released on 20 August 1976.

Plot

Cast 
Vijayakumar
Sripriya
Manorama
V. S. Raghavan
Y. G. Mahendran
Major Sundarrajan

Production 
Paalooti Valartha Kili was based on the stage play Raja Parambarai by Komal Swaminathan. The film's screenplay was written by Vietnam Veedu Sundaram, and dialogues were written by Swaminathan. The title was derived from a song from Gauravam (1973).

Soundtrack 
The soundtrack was composed by Ilaiyaraaja. The songs "Naan Pesa Vandhen" and "Kola Kolaya" were hugely popular. "Naan Pesa Vandhen" was the first song that S. P. Balasubrahmanyam sang for Ilaiyaraaja. It is set in the Carnatic raga Khamas.

Release and reception 
Paalooti Valartha Kili was released on 20 August 1976. Kanthan of Kalki wrote the screenplay languishes like a flag waving to a fat horn, limping till the intermission only after that the roles are formed, it is less because the stage play is filmed as it is and concluded calling the film a play shot on camera.

References

External links 
 

1970s Tamil-language films
1976 drama films
Films directed by Devaraj–Mohan
Films scored by Ilaiyaraaja
Indian drama films
Indian films based on plays